Dwi-Madhyama Panchama Varja ragas is a melakarta scheme of Carnatic music of South India, mentioned in the Ashtotharasata (108) mela scheme. In this scheme the regular 72 mela ragas are expanded to 108, by including the possible 36 vikritha panchama melas. The 36 additional melakartas take both the madhyamas and do not have the panchama, in which the prathi madhyama is sung in place of panchama.

Origins 
S. Kalyanaraman, popularly known as SKR, was a legendary vocalist in the Carnatic tradition. Hailing from a famed musical family, where his great-grandfather was Komal Muthu Bhagavathar and his grand uncle was the celebrated vocalist Madirimangalam Natesa Iyer, S. Kalyanaraman became one of the foremost disciples of G. N. Balasubramaniam and established himself as an original musician in his own right. Kalyanaraman's music undeniably bore the GNB mudra.

Later Kalyanaraman ventured deeper into the scales and came up with the 36 Dwi madhyama panchama varja ragams.

Example 
For example, the scale of Mayamalavagowla is
Arohana : S R1 G3 M1 P D1 N3 S
Avarohana : S N3 D1 P M1 G3 R1 S

The equivalent raga in the additional 36 ragas is Mayasri's, the scale for which is
Arohana : S R1 G3 M1 M2 D1 N3 S
Avarohana : S N3 D1 M2 M1 G3 R1 S

In above example, the Panchama (P) is replaced by prati madhyama (M2).

Extended ragas 
The name of the mela can be easily found out by looking at the first word. All these ragas have the suffix "Sri". Likewise the scale for all the 36 ragas can be easily derived.

Nomenclature given by Tanjavur S. Kalyanaraman is as follows :
 Kanakangi – Kanagasri
 Rathnangi – Rathnasri
 Ganamurthy – Ganasri
 Vanaspathy – Vanasri
 Manavathi – Manasri
 Thanarupi – Thanasri
 Senavati – Sunadhasri
 Hanuma Thodi – Hanumasri
 Dhenuka – Dhensri
 Natakapriya – Natakasri
 Kokilapriya – Kokilasri
 Roopavathi – Roopasri
 Gayakapriya – Gayakasri
 Vakulabharanam – Vakulasri
 Mayamalavagowla – Mayasri
 Chakravakam – Chakrasri
 Suryakantham – Suryasri
 Hatakambari – Hatasri
 Jhankaradhwani – Jhankarasri
 Natabhairavi – Natasri
 Kiravani – Kiranasri
 Kharaharapriya – Kharasri
 Gowrimanohari – Gowrisri
 VarunaPriya – Varunasri
 Mararanjani – Marasri
 Charukesi – Charusri
 Sarasangi – Sarasri
 Harikamboji – Harisri
 Dheerasankarabharanam – Dheerasri
 Naganandhani – Nagasri
 Yagapriya – Yagasri
 Raghavardhani – Raghasri
 Gangeyabooshani – Gangasri
 Vaghadheeswari – Vaghasri
 Sulini—Sulinisri
 Chalanata – Chalasri

References

Carnatic music
Carnatic music terminology